Constance Jawureck (also Jawurek or Javoureck) (1803–1858) was a French mezzo-soprano opera singer.
 
The daughter of a German musician, she was born in Paris and entered the Paris Conservatory at the age of 14 where she studied singing under Plantade and Garat and acting under Baptiste. She made her stage debut to considerable success in 1822 as Zarine in the posthumous premiere of Isouard's Aladin ou La lampe merveilleuse. She continued to be cast in relatively small roles until her success in 1826 as Amazily in a revival of Gasparo Spontini's Fernand Cortez after which she became a leading mezzo-soprano at the Paris Opera. Amongst the roles she created there were in Inès in Auber's Vendôme en Espagne (1822), Isolier in Rossini's Le comte Ory (1828), Jeanette in Auber's Le philtre (1831) and Fleur de Lys in Bertin's La Esmeralda (1836). She remained at the Paris Opera until 1837 and then became a leading singer in Brussels where she sang the title role in Donizetti's Lucie de Lammermoor for its first performance at the Théâtre Royal de la Monnaie (1839). Jawureck was known for her beauty as well as her voice, and according to Hector Berlioz's biographer, David Cairns, both Berlioz and his friend, the poet , were hopelessly in love with her, a sentiment which she did not reciprocate.

Notes and references

Sources
Burat de Gurgy, Edmond (1837). "Mlle. Jawureck", Biographie des acteurs de Paris. Edouard Proux 
Cairns, David (2003). Berlioz: Volume One: The Making of an Artist, 1803–1832. University of California Press. 
; 
Weinstock, Herbert (1968). Rossini: A Biography, Oxford University Press

Further reading
Chaalons d'Argé, Auguste Philibert (1824). Histoire critique et littéraire des théâtres de Paris, année 1822. Pollet. 
Scribe, Eugène and Auber, Daniel (1998). Correspondance d'Eugène Scribe et de Daniel-François-Esprit Auber, edited and annotated by Herbert Schneider. Mardaga.  

1803 births
1858 deaths
French operatic mezzo-sopranos
French people of German descent
Conservatoire de Paris alumni
Musicians from Paris
19th-century French women opera singers